is a professional Japanese baseball player. As of November 2021 he was a coach of the Hiroshima Toyo Carp.

References

External links

1974 births
Living people
Baseball people from Hiroshima Prefecture
Senshu University alumni
Japanese baseball players
Nippon Professional Baseball pitchers
Hiroshima Toyo Carp players
Japanese baseball coaches
Nippon Professional Baseball coaches